In the United States of America, state library agencies established in each state have long been a catalyst for a great deal of the motivation for public library cooperation. This has been since the founding of the movement, starting in 1890 when Massachusetts created a state Board of Library Commissioners charged to help communities establish and improve public libraries. Over the years, state library agencies played a major role in encouraging larger units of service to provide library resources. The Library Services Act (1956) and the Library Services and Construction Act (1964) were keystones in the goal of providing library service throughout the nation.

In addition, many of the 50 states have state archives similar to the federal National Archives and Records Administration to keep records relating to information on state laws, census information, etc.


Table

References

External links

 California State Archives on Google Cultural Institute
List of state archives from National Archives and Records Administration
USA State libraries list at Lib-web.org
List of state libraries from publiclibraries.com

Libraries and archives